Browns is an unincorporated community in Dallas County, Alabama.  Browns formerly had one site included on the National Register of Historic Places, St. Luke's Episcopal Church, before it was removed to Cahaba in 2006.
It is home to a community airport.

References

Unincorporated communities in Alabama
Unincorporated communities in Dallas County, Alabama